Ategumia adipalis is a moth of the family Crambidae described by Julius Lederer in 1863. It is found from India to Australia and in Japan, Sri Lanka, Vietnam and China. It was introduced to Hawaii in 1965.

The wingspan is about 21 mm. Adults are pale yellow with broad brown margins to the wings. The forewings also have a broad brown band along the costa. Each hindwing has a brown spot near the centre.

The larvae feed on Melastoma candidum and Melastoma malabathricum. They roll the leaves of their host plant.

Subspecies
Ategumia adipalis adipalis Lederer, 1863
Ategumia  adipalis nigromarginalis  Caradja, 1925 (from China)

References

External links
Australian Insects
Japanese Moths
Biological Control of Weeds: Southeast Asian Prospects

Spilomelinae
Moths of Asia
Moths of Australia
Moths described in 1863